The U.S. Post Office and Customhouse in Gulfport, Mississippi is a historic post office and customhouse that was completed in 1910 under supervision of the U.S. Treasury Department, with James Knox Taylor as Supervising Architect.  One of the oldest public or commercial structures in the city, it also has been known as Downtown Station and as Old Main Post Office.  In 1963 a one-story extension to the rear was added.

It was listed on the National Register of Historic Places in 1984.

Its NRHP nomination asserted "It is a beautifully proportioned building with elegant and tasteful embellishments and is significant as one of the finest examples of
Second Renaissance Revival architecture in Mississippi."

References

External links
 

Government buildings completed in 1910
Renaissance Revival architecture in Mississippi
Post office buildings on the National Register of Historic Places in Mississippi
Buildings and structures in Gulfport, Mississippi
National Register of Historic Places in Harrison County, Mississippi
Custom houses on the National Register of Historic Places